The 2018 Tallahassee mayoral election took place on August 28 and November 6, 2018, to elect the Mayor of Tallahassee, Florida.

Incumbent mayor Andrew Gillum decided to focus his campaign on the 2018 Florida gubernatorial election instead of seeking re-election which opened up a new seat for the mayor’s office. A blanket primary was held on August 28 with both John E. Dailey and Dustin R. Daniels receiving the most votes. Because neither the candidate received a majority, a run-off election was held on November 8. From there,  Dailey defeated Daniels by a close margin of 51% to 49%.

Candidates

Declared 

 John E. Dailey, chairman of the Leon County Commission
 Dustin R. Daniels, Mayor's chief of staff
 Michelle Rehwinkel Vasilinda, attorney, professor
 Carrie Litherland, advocate
 Joe West, veteran
 Norris Barr, former employee

Potential 

 Bill Montford, state senator

Withdrawn 

 Erik David, instructor, veteran
 Bob Lotane, communications executive
 Gil Ziffer, city commissioner

Results

First round

Runoff

References

2018
2018 Florida elections
2018 United States mayoral elections